Paul Antoine Alphonse Bisciglia (30 July 1928 – 18 April 2010) was a French film actor.

Career
Throughout his acting career, Bisciglia appeared in more than one hundred feature films.  He made his debut in the 1950 film Trois télégrammes.  What followed was several uncredited roles, before landing a much larger part in drama Clara de Montargis.  During the fifties, he appeared in many drama films, including the award-winning Avant le déluge, with Antoine Balpêtré, and again several more uncredited roles.  During the sixties, Bisciglia began to appear more frequently in television series and television films, although he was included in many films such as The Wretches, with Michèle Morgan, Les vieux de la vieille, with Pierre Fresnay, Paris nous appartient, Le signe du lion, and in 1966, he appeared in his first leading role in Alain Cuniot's L'or et le plomb.

In 1969, Bisciglia had a small role in the horror film La vampire nue, the second feature film from director Jean Rollin.  It was Bisciglia's first of several times working with Rollin.  He worked with the director again in the successful films Requiem pour un vampire, with Marie-Pierre Castel and Mireille D'Argent, Les démoniaques, Lèvres de sang, and the zombie classic Les Raisins de la Mort, with Marie-Georges Pascal.

His career continued through the seventies and eighties, such as the Golden Globe-nominated Les aventures de Rabbi Jacob, Club privé pour couples avertis, with Philippe Gasté of Jean Rollin's Requiem pour un vampire, Verdict, with Sophia Loren, L'aile ou la cuisse, Family Rock, and he voiced in three animated films Astérix et la surprise de César (Asterix vs. Caesar), Astérix chez les Bretons (Asterix in Britain) and Astérix et le coup du menhir (Asterix and the Big Fight). Bisciglia's acting career continued until 1999, during which he appeared in two final feature films, Profil bas and Montana Blues.

Bisciglia also had a successful television career appearing in a number of television series and films.  He made his first appearance in the 1957 television film L'équipage au complet.  His television films include Elle s'abaisse pour vaincre, Les fiancés de Loches, Claudine à Paris and the television film remeke Les liaisons dangereuses.  His television series credits include Le théâtre de la jeunesse, Rocambole, Les saintes chéries, Schulmeister, espion de l'empereur, Les brigades du Tigre, De mémoire d'homme, Les cinq dernières minutes, Désiré Lafarge, Commissaire Moulin, Les enquêtes du commissaire Maigret and Julien Fontanes, magistrat.

Selected filmography

 Three Telegrams (1950) - Jeune facteur
 Beware of Blondes (1950) - (uncredited)
 Under the Paris Sky (1951) - (uncredited)
 The Beautiful Image (1951) - (uncredited)
 Clara de Montargis (1951)
 Le désir et l'amour (1951)
 La grande vie (1951)
 Le Dindon (1951) - Victor - le groom
 Before the Deluge (1954) - Jean-Jacques Noblet
 Quay of Blondes (1954) - Le chasseur de l'hôtel
 Papa, Mama, the Maid and I (1954) - Un locataire du sixième étage (uncredited)
 Men in White (1955) - Un interne
 M'sieur la Caille (1955) - Loupe
 Pardonnez nos offenses (1956)
 Short Head (1956) - Un chasseur de l'hôtel (uncredited)
 Les lumières du soir (1956) - Un copain de Catherine au restaurant
 The Hunchback of Notre Dame (1956) - Un homme à la fête des fous (uncredited)
 The River of Three Junks (1957) - Le chauffeur de taxi / Driver (uncredited)
 The Seventh Commandment (1957) - Le chasseur
 Funny Face (1957) - Photographer (uncredited)
 Comme un cheveu sur la soupe (1957) - Le livreur de fleurs (uncredited)
 Le souffle du désir (1958)
 La liberté surveillée (1958) - Riri
 La p... sentimentale (1958) - Le chauffeur
 Les Cousins (1959) - Marc
 Douze heures d'horloge (1959)
 Les tripes au soleil (1959) - (uncredited)
 Un témoin dans la ville (1959) - Un chauffeur de taxi
 Bal de nuit (1959)
 Lovers on a Tightrope (1960) - Le mécano
 Les scélérats (1960)
 Les mordus (1960) - Le peintre
 The Old Guard (1960) - Jojo, le fiancé de Mariette
 Les filles sèment le vent (1961)
 La Belle Américaine (1961) - Un coursier (uncredited)
 All the Gold in the World (1961) - Un photographe
 Paris Belongs to Us (1961) - Paul
 The Sign of Leo (1962) - Willy
 Arsène Lupin contre Arsène Lupin (1962) - Un croque-mort (uncredited)
 The Bamboo Stroke (1963)
 Méfiez-vous, mesdames (1963) - Le barman
 Cherchez l'idole (1964) - L'assistant du tailleur (uncredited)
 The Troops of St. Tropez (1964) - Le conseiller du prince (uncredited)
 La grosse caisse (1965) - Un machiniste (uncredited)
 Pas de caviar pour tante Olga (1965)
 Le caïd de Champignol (1966)
 L'or et le plomb (1966)
 Is Paris Burning? (1966) - Un homme sur un char (uncredited)
 The Sunday of Life (1967) - Le vendeur de journaux (uncredited)
 Action Man (1967) - Le barman (uncredited)
 Hibernatus (1969) - Le prêtre moderne (uncredited)
 La Vampire Nue (1970) - Butler
 Children of Mata Hari (1970)
 The Little Theatre of Jean Renoir (1970, TV Movie) - Un clochard (segment "Le dernier réveillon")
 Dougal and the Blue Cat (1970) - Le Chat Bleu (voice)
 Comptes à rebours (1971)
 Le cinéma de papa (1971) - L'acteur refusé à l'audition
 Bof... Anatomie d'un livreur (1971) - Le contremaître
 Requiem pour un Vampire (1971) - L'homme au vélo
 Le Viager (1972) - Un maquisard (uncredited)
 Fusil chargé (1972)
 L'oeuf (1972) - Un employé de Dufiquet
 Les galets d'Étretat (1972)
 Murder Is a Murder (1972) - L'employé de Kastner
 Les voraces (1973)
 Elle court, elle court la banlieue (1973) - M. Max
 Don Juan, or If Don Juan Were a Woman (1973)
 There's No Smoke Without Fire (1973)
 Le désir et la volupté (1973)
 L'affaire Crazy Capo (1973) - Le barman
 The Mad Adventures of Rabbi Jacob (1973) - Le pompiste
 La dernière bourrée à Paris (1973)
 Mais où est donc passée la septième compagnie ? (1973) - Le père
 Housewives on the Job (1973)
 Club privé pour couples avertis (1974) - Le livreur (uncredited)
 Bloody Murder (1974) - Le médecin légiste
 On s'est trompé d'histoire d'amour (1974) - Un chauffeur de taxi
 Comment réussir quand on est con et pleurnichard (1974) - Le chasseur PLM
 Grandeur nature (1974) - Le douanier (uncredited)
 Comme un pot de fraises (1974)
 Verdict (1974) - Un juré
 La kermesse érotique (1974) - Cremier
 The Slap (1974) - Le serveur
 Young Casanova (1974) - Le flic dubitatif
 Les Démoniaques (1974) - Paul - un naugrageur
 La soupe froide (1975) - Le garde-champêtre
 L'important c'est d'aimer (1975) - L'assistant-metteur en scène
 Lévres de Sang (1975) - Le psychiatre
 On a retrouvé la 7ème compagnie ! (1975) - Claumachet
 Indécences (1975) - L'homme des bois
 Lumière (1976) - La Bougie
 Perversions (1976) - Le couple au square
 Suce-moi vampire (1976) - Le médecin
 The Wing or the Thigh (1976) - Le bagagiste
 Soumissions perverses (1977) - Jules Larrigau
 Délectations (1977) - Orgon
 Exhibitions danoises (1977) - Le patron du théâtre
 Vicieuses et insatisfaites (1977)
 Brigade call-girls (1977) - Henri
 Animal (1977) - Le gardien
 Marche pas sur mes lacets (1977)
 Les Raisins de la Mort (1978) - Lucas
 Les ringards (1978)
 Cause toujours... tu m'intéresses! (1979) - L'agent de police
 Ta gueule, je t'aime! (1980) - Le metteur en scène
 Trop au lit pour être honnête (1980) - La garçon
 Anthracite (1980) - Le concierge
 Les contes de La Fontaine (1980) - Messire Jean
 Les deux mains (1980) - L'émir
 Julien Fontanes, magistrat (1980-1986, TV Series) - Albert Piot / L'interviewer / Le technicien TV
 Belles, blondes et bronzées (1981)
 Salut... j'arrive! (1982)
 Lucie sur Seine (1982) - Le commissaire #1
 Family Rock (1982)
 La baraka (1982) - Le client
 C'est facile et ça peut rapporter... 20 ans (1983)
 Les planqués du régiment (1983)
 Asterix Versus Caesar (1985) - (voice)
 La dernière image (1986)
 Love Without Pity (1989) - L'homme de l'Huma
 Asterix and the Big Fight (1989) - Agecanonix (voice)
 Profil bas (1993) - Le patron du bistrot
 Montana Blues (1995) - Le chauffeur de taxi

References

External links
 

1928 births
2010 deaths
French male film actors
French male television actors
People from Algiers
20th-century French male actors